Lawrence Jackson (born 1985) is an American football player.

Lawrence Jackson may also refer to: 

 Lawrence Jackson (judge) (1914–1993), Australian jurist
 Lawrence Jackson (photographer), American photojournalist
 Lawrence Jackson (priest) (1926–2002), British priest
 Lawrence Jackson (rower) (1907–1937), New Zealand rower
 Lawrence Stanley Jackson (1884–1974), Australian Taxation Commissioner

See also
 Laurence Jackson (1900–1984), Scottish curler.